DC Comics Presents is a comic book series published by DC Comics from 1978 to 1986 which ran for 97 issues and four Annuals. It featured team-ups between Superman and a wide variety of other characters in the DC Universe. A recurring back-up feature "Whatever Happened to...?" had stories revealing the status of various minor and little-used characters.

Publication history
DC Comics Presents debuted with a July/August 1978 cover date and was edited by Julius Schwartz. The series was launched with a team-up of Superman and the Flash by writer Martin Pasko and artist José Luis García-López. The winner of the DC Comics Presents letter column name contest appeared in the Superman/Hawkman story in issue #11 (July 1979). The "Whatever Happened to...?" backup feature began in issue #25 (Sept. 1980) and would appear in most issues for the next two years until its last installment in issue #48 (Aug. 1982). Issue #26 included an insert introduction story to the then-upcoming New Teen Titans series by Marv Wolfman and George Pérez. Len Wein and Jim Starlin co-created the supervillain Mongul in issue #27 (Nov. 1980) as part of a three-issue storyline. Another insert in issue #41 previewed the "new direction" Wonder Woman. In issue #47, Superman traveled to Eternia and met the Masters of the Universe. Ambush Bug made his first appearance in issue #52 (Dec. 1982) and made additional appearances in issues #59 and 81. The Superman/Challengers of the Unknown tale in issue #84 was drawn by Jack Kirby and Alex Toth. The series also contained the Alan Moore Superman/Swamp Thing story "The Jungle Line" in DC Comics Presents #85 (Sept. 1985), pencilled by Rick Veitch and inked by Al Williamson. Issue #87 featured the first appearance and origin of the divergent Kal-El of the Earth Prime reality, who would become known as Superboy-Prime. The last issue is an exception to the team-up format, instead featuring Superman in an "Untold Tale" involving the Phantom Zone by Steve Gerber, following up as the conclusion to Gerber's previous limited series of the same title.

In 2004, the title DC Comics Presents was revived for eight one-shot issues, each a tribute to DC editor Julius Schwartz who had recently died. Each issue featured two stories based on a classic DC Comics cover of the past, reflecting Schwartz's frequent practice of commissioning a cover concept, then telling the writers to create a story about that cover.

In 2010, DC launched a new DC Comics Presents, a line of 100-page reprint issues reprinting stories that have not seen print since their original publication.

Featured team-ups

Characters featured in the "Whatever Happened to...?" back-up series 

Writer Mike Tiefenbacher had several proposals for other "Whatever Happened to...?" stories. These included Captain Action, Blackhawk, Genius Jones, Nighthawk, the Ragman, the Sea Devils, the Silent Knight, and Wildcat.

Julius Schwartz tribute
In September and October 2004, the title DC Comics Presents was revived for a series of eight one-shot issues, each a tribute to DC editor Julius Schwartz, who had died the previous February. Each issue featured two stories based on a classic DC Comics cover of the past, reflecting Schwartz's frequent practice of commissioning a cover concept, then telling the writers to create a story about that cover.

2010 revival
In 2010, DC launched a new DC Comics Presents series featuring stories that have not seen print since their original publication.
The issues are:
DC Comics Presents: Batman #1 (October 2010), which spotlights Batman and reprints Batman #582–585 (10/20/2010).
DC Comics Presents: Batman #2 (November 2010), reprints Batman #591–594 (11/17/2010).
DC Comics Presents: Batman #3 (December 2010), reprints Batman #595–598 (12/15/2010).
DC Comics Presents: Brightest Day #1, which spotlights Deadman and Hawkman and reprints selected stories from Hawkman #27, 34 and 36, Solo #8, DCU Holiday '09 and Strange Adventures #205.
DC Comics Presents: Brightest Day #2, which spotlights the Martian Manhunter and Firestorm the Nuclear Man (both Ronnie Raymond and Martin Stein and Jason Rusch) and reprints Martian Manhunter #24 and Firestorm #11–13.
DC Comics Presents: Ethan Van Sciver, which spotlights the art of Ethan Van Sciver and reprints Batman and Catwoman: Trail of the Gun #1–2.
DC Comics Presents: The Flash and Green Lantern: Faster Friends, which spotlights Green Lantern V (Kyle Rayner) and the Flash III (Wally West) and reprints both issues of the titular miniseries.
DC Comics Presents: Green Lantern, which spotlights Green Lantern V (Kyle Rayner) and Jade and reprints Green Lantern (vol. 3) #137–140.
DC Comics Presents: Jack Cross, which spotlights Jack Cross and reprints issues #1–4 of his self-titled series.
DC Comics Presents: J. H. Williams III, which spotlights the art of J. H. Williams III and reprints Chase #1 and 6–8.
DC Comics Presents: Legion of Super-Heroes #1, which spotlights Dan Abnett and Andy Lanning's re-invention of the Legion of Super-Heroes leading into Legion Lost and reprints Legion of Super-Heroes (vol. 4) #122-123 and Legionnaires #79-80.
DC Comics Presents: Legion of Super-Heroes #2, which spotlights Geoff Johns and reprints Adventure Comics #0-4, Action Comics #864 and 900 and the Mon-El story from Action Comics Annual #10.
DC Comics Presents: Superman #1, which spotlights Superman and reprints Superman #179-180 and 185 and Superman: The Man of Steel #121.
DC Comics Presents: Superman #2, reprints Superman: The Man of Steel #133, Superman #189, The Adventures of Superman #611 and Action Comics #798.
DC Comics Presents: Superman #3, reprints Superman #177–178 and 181–182.  
DC Comics Presents: Superman #4, reprints Action Comics #768 and 771–773.  
DC Comics Presents: Young Justice #1, which spotlights Young Justice and reprints JLA: World without Grown-Ups #1–2.
DC Comics Presents: Young Justice #2, reprints Young Justice Secret Files and Origins #1, Young Justice in No Man's Land, and Young Justice: The Secret.
Vertigo Resurrected, which contains a controversial and previously unpublished John Constantine, Hellblazer story by Warren Ellis.

Collected editions
 Showcase Presents DC Comics Presents: Superman Team-Ups Vol. 1 includes DC Comics Presents #1–26, 512 pages, November 2009, 
 Showcase Presents DC Comics Presents: Superman Team-Ups Vol. 2 includes DC Comics Presents #27–50 and Annual #1, 512 pages, July 2013, 
 Superman vs. Flash includes DC Comics Presents #1–2, 208 pages, May 2005, 
 Adventures of Superman: José Luis García-López includes DC Comics Presents #1–4, 17, 20, 24, and 31, 360 pages, April 2013, 
 Superman's Greatest Team-Ups includes DC Comics Presents #5, 9–10, 12, 14, 19, 28, 30, 35, 38–39, 45, 50, 58, 63, 67, 71, 97; 400 pages, April 2021, 
 Superman in the Seventies includes DC Comics Presents #14, 224 pages, November 2000, 
 Deadman Omnibus includes DC Comics Presents #24, 944 pages, December 2020, 
 The Phantom Stranger Omnibus includes DC Comics Presents #25 and 72; 1,184 pages, May 2022, 
 The New Teen Titans Archives Vol. 1 includes the New Teen Titans story from DC Comics Presents #26, 240 pages, February 1999, 
 The New Teen Titans Omnibus Vol. 1 includes the New Teen Titans story from DC Comics Presents #26, 684 pages, September 2011, 
 Superman in the Eighties includes DC Comics Presents #29, 192 pages, April 2006, 
 The Spectre: The Wrath of the Spectre Omnibus includes DC Comics Presents #29, 680 pages, September 2020, 
 Legends of the Dark Knight: José Luis García-López includes DC Comics Presents #31 and 41, 472 pages, November 2021, 
 Superman vs. Shazam! includes DC Comics Presents #33–34, 49, and Annual #3, 192 pages, March 2013, 
 Superman vs. Shazam! includes DC Comics Presents #33–34, 49, and Annual #3, 256 pages, March 2021, 
 Joker: The Bronze Age Omnibus includes DC Comics Presents #41, 72; 832 pages, August 2019, 
 Wonder Woman: 80 Years of the Amazon Warrior - The Deluxe Edition includes DC Comics Presents #41, 416 pages, August 2021, 
 DC Through the 80s: The End of Eras includes DC Comics Presents Annual #1, 520 pages, December 2020, 
 Showcase Presents Ambush Bug Vol. 1 includes DC Comics Presents #52, 59, and 81, 488 pages, March 2009, 
 Shazam! The Greatest Stories Ever Told includes DC Comics Presents Annual #3, 224 pages, February 2008, 
 Adventures of Superman: Gil Kane includes DC Comics Presents Annual #3, 392 pages, January 2013, 
 Batman and the Outsiders Vol. 3 includes DC Comics Presents #83, 288 pages, April 2019, 
 The Greatest Team-Up Stories Ever Told includes DC Comics Presents #85, 288 pages, December 1989, 
 DC Universe by Alan Moore includes DC Comics Presents #85, 464 pages, March 2012,

See also 

 Super-Team Family
 Marvel Comics Presents

References

External links
 
 

1978 comics debuts
1986 comics endings
Comics anthologies
Comics by Alan Moore
Comics by Dennis O'Neil
Comics by George Pérez
Comics by Gerry Conway
Comics by Jim Starlin
Comics by Keith Giffen
Comics by Len Wein
Comics by Marv Wolfman
Comics by Paul Kupperberg
Comics by Paul Levitz
Comics by Roy Thomas
Comics by Steve Englehart
Comics by Steve Gerber
DC Comics titles
Defunct American comics
Team-up comics